Can't Stop may refer to:

 Can't Stop (album) or the title song, by Ashanti, 2004
 Can't Stop (EP) or the title song (see below), by CNBLUE, 2014
 Can't Stop (board game), a 1980 dice game designed by Sid Sackson

Songs 
 "Can't Stop" (After 7 song), 1990
 "Can't Stop" (CNBLUE song), 2014
 "Can't Stop" (Jacksoul song), 2000
 "Can't Stop" (Red Hot Chili Peppers song), 2002
 "Can't Stop", by Ace Hood from Gutta
 "Can't Stop", by DaBaby from Blame It on Baby
 "Can't Stop", by Dave Matthews Band from Live at Wrigley Field
 "Can't Stop", by Elbow from Asleep in the Back
 "Can't Stop", by Infected Mushroom from Legend of the Black Shawarma
 "Can't Stop", by Lil' O
 "Can't Stop", by M83 from Before the Dawn Heals Us
 "Can't Stop", by Madonna from the Who's That Girl soundtrack
 "Can't Stop", by Maroon 5 from It Won't Be Soon Before Long
 "Can't Stop", by Martin Solveig featuring Dragonette from Smash
 "Can't Stop", by OneRepublic from Native
 "Can't Stop", by Ozomatli from Don't Mess with the Dragon
 "Can't Stop", by Rick James from Glow
 "Can't Stop", by Suicidal Tendencies from The Art of Rebellion
 "Can't Stop (22nd Century Lifestyle)", by pre)Thing from 22nd Century Lifestyle

See also
 
 Conan O'Brien Can't Stop, a documentary film
 Don't Stop (disambiguation)